Simon MacKenzie (also known as S.P. MacKenzie) is a military historian, author and academic. He was educated at the University of Toronto and received a DPhil from the University of Oxford in 1989.

MacKenzie teaches at the University of South Carolina.  He has won the Templer Medal, awarded by the Society for Army Historical Research (“for the
book which in the Society’s view has made the greatest contribution to the study
of British military history.”) for his 1992 book, 'Politics and Military Morale: Current-Affairs and Citizenship Education in the British Army 1914–1950'.

Works
 The Battle of Britain on Screen: 'The Few' in British Film and Television Drama, Bloomsbury, 2016
 The Imjin and Kapyong Battles, Korea 1951, Indiana University Press, 2013
 British Prisoners of the Korean War, Oxford University Press, 2012
 Bader's War: 'Have a Go at Everything''', Spellmount, 2008
 The Second World War in Europe, Longman, 2009
 British War Films, 1939-1945: The Cinema and the Services, Continuum, 2006
  The Colditz Myth: British and Commonwealth Prisoners of War in Nazi Germany, Oxford University Press, 2004
 Revolutionary Armies in the Modern Era: A Revisionist Approach, Routledge, 1997
  The Home Guard: A Military and Political History, Oxford University Press, 1995
 Politics and Military Morale: Current-Affairs and Citizenship Education in the British Army, 1914-1950'', Oxford University Press, 1992

External links
 Brief biography and c.v. – University of South Carolina, Department of History

1961 births
Living people
British military historians
Historians of World War II
University of Toronto alumni
British male writers
Alumni of the University of Oxford